Sankt Gotthard im Mühlkreis is a municipality in the district of Urfahr-Umgebung in Upper Austria, Austria.

Attractions include Schloss Eschelberg, a stately home built in 1596, and the ruined 13th century Rottenegg Castle.

Villages
The municipality contains the following villages:

Eschelberg 
Grasbach
Haselwies
Maierleiten
Mühlholz
Oberstraß
Rottenegg

Population

Gallery

References

Cities and towns in Urfahr-Umgebung District